Auto Hotel Building is a historic parking garage located in downtown Evansville, Indiana. Auto Hotel was built in 1929, and is a four-story, Colonial Revival style brick building.

It was listed on the National Register of Historic Places in 1984.

References

Colonial Revival architecture in Indiana
1929 architecture
Buildings and structures in Evansville, Indiana
National Register of Historic Places in Evansville, Indiana
Garages (parking) on the National Register of Historic Places